Pors Fotball is a Norwegian football club from Porsgrunn, currently playing in the 3. divisjon. Pors plays in blue jerseys, and their home ground is Pors Stadion. Notable former players include Jan Halvor Halvorsen and Erik Pedersen.

History
The club was founded on 25 May 1905 under the name Lyn, and changed its name to IF Pors in 1914 because the original name was already in use. The best performances of the team was in 1948–49 and 1970 when they played in the top division. The team has had unsuccessful bids for promotion to the top division in 1972, 1979, 1981 and 1983.

Concurrent with the 1994 name change the club entered into a still ongoing elite-level athletics partnership with the other and dominant Grenland football club, Odd Grenland. In February 2005 IF Pors retained other sports activities whereas Pors Grenland Fotball was siphoned off as a separate sports team, however still under the auspices of IF Pors. In December 2009, the financial cooperation between Pors Grenland and Odd Grenland was terminated.

Between 2004 and 2006 the team played in the 1. divisjon but then slipped down to the 2. divisjon where they played until the team was relegated to 3. divisjon in 2014. Pors have been playing in 3. divisjon since 2017.

Recent history 
{|class="wikitable"
|-bgcolor="#efefef"
! Season
! 
! Pos.
! Pl.
! W
! D
! L
! GS
! GA
! P
!Cup
!Notes
|-
|2005
|1. divisjon
|align=right |6
|align=right|30||align=right|13||align=right|11||align=right|6
|align=right|47||align=right|45||align=right|50
|Third round
|
|-
|2006
|1. divisjon
|align=right bgcolor="#FFCCCC"| 13
|align=right|30||align=right|10||align=right|5||align=right|15
|align=right|51||align=right|65||align=right|35
|Third round
|Relegated to the 2. divisjon
|-
|2007
|2. divisjon
|align=right |7
|align=right|26||align=right|10||align=right|5||align=right|11
|align=right|39||align=right|44||align=right|35
|Second round
|
|-
|2008
|2. divisjon
|align=right |4
|align=right|26||align=right|15||align=right|6||align=right|5
|align=right|62||align=right|41||align=right|51
||Third round
|
|-
|2009
|2. divisjon
|align=right |2
|align=right|26||align=right|18||align=right|3||align=right|5
|align=right|76||align=right|44||align=right|57
||First round
|
|-
|2010
|2. divisjon
|align=right |9
|align=right|26||align=right|11||align=right|4||align=right|11
|align=right|41||align=right|41||align=right|37
||First round
|
|-
|2011 
|2. divisjon
|align=right |11
|align=right|26||align=right|8||align=right|5||align=right|13
|align=right|42||align=right|53||align=right|29
||First round
|
|-
|2012 
|2. divisjon
|align=right |8
|align=right|26||align=right|10||align=right|6||align=right|10
|align=right|40||align=right|36||align=right|36
||Second round
|
|-
|2013
|2. divisjon
|align=right |5
|align=right|26||align=right|12||align=right|5||align=right|9
|align=right|44||align=right|44||align=right|41
||Second round
|
|-
|2014
|2. divisjon
|align=right bgcolor="#FFCCCC"| 12
|align=right|26||align=right|7||align=right|5||align=right|14
|align=right|43||align=right|60||align=right|26
|Second round
|Relegated to the 3. divisjon
|-
|2015
|3. divisjon
|align=right bgcolor=#DDFFDD| 1
|align=right|26||align=right|20||align=right|2||align=right|4
|align=right|96||align=right|36||align=right|62
|First round
|Promoted to the 2. divisjon
|-
|2016
|2. divisjon
|align=right bgcolor="#FFCCCC"| 12
|align=right|26||align=right|9||align=right|2||align=right|15
|align=right|44||align=right|71||align=right|29
|First round
|Relegated to the 3. divisjon
|-
|2017
|3. divisjon
|align=right| 2
|align=right|26||align=right|16||align=right|3||align=right|7
|align=right|84||align=right|43||align=right|51
|Second round
|
|-
|2018
|3. divisjon
|align=right| 7
|align=right|26||align=right|11||align=right|4||align=right|11
|align=right|58||align=right|51||align=right|37
|First round
|
|-
|2019
|3. divisjon
|align=right| 7
|align=right|26||align=right|11||align=right|3||align=right|12
|align=right|42||align=right|44||align=right|36
|Second round
|
|}

References

External links
Official site

Football clubs in Norway
Eliteserien clubs
Sport in Porsgrunn
Association football clubs established in 1905
Bandy clubs established in 1905
1905 establishments in Norway
Defunct bandy clubs in Norway